Elections were held in Slovakia's 8 self-governing regions on 4 November 2017.

In 2017, deputies of the Slovak National Council voted to extend the term of governors from 4 years to 5 years, and change from a 2-round election to only 1 round.

The turnout was around 30%, biggest in the history of Slovak regional elections.

Results

Bratislava Region

Trnava Region

Trenčín Region

Nitra Region

Žilina Region

Banská Bystrica Region

Prešov Region

Košice Region

Polls

Banská Bystrica governorship

Bratislava governorship

Trnava governorship

References 

Elections in Slovakia
2017 elections in Europe
November 2017 events in Europe
2017 in Slovakia
Regional elections in Slovakia